Macropophora lacordairei is a species of beetle in the family Cerambycidae. It was described by Lepesme in 1946.

References

Acanthoderini
Beetles described in 1946